The Sun Odyssey 389 is a French sailboat that was designed by Marc Lombard and the Jeanneau Design Office, as a cruiser and first built in 2015.

The boat is a development of the Sun Odyssey 379 with the same hull design, with a wider drop-down swimming platform and a bowsprit added.

Production
The design was built by Jeanneau in France, starting in 2015, but it is now out of production.

Design
The Sun Odyssey 389 is a recreational keelboat, built predominantly of fiberglass, with wood trim. It has a 9/10 fractional sloop rig with a bow sprit, with a deck-stepped mast, two sets of swept spreaders and aluminum spars with 1X19 stainless steel wire rigging. The hull has a plumb stem, a reverse transom with a drop-down tailgate, an internally mounted spade-type rudder controlled by dual wheels and a fixed "L"-shaped fin keel with a weighted bulb, optional shoal-draft keel or stub keel and fiberglass centerboard. The centerboard version has twin rudders.

The fin keel model displaces  empty and carries  of cast iron ballast, the shoal draft version displaces  empty and carries  of cast iron ballast and the centerboard version displaces  empty and carries  of exterior cast iron ballast.

The design was built in two and three-cabin interior arrangements. The two cabin version has sleeping accommodation for four people, with a double "V"-berth in the bow cabin, a "U"-shaped settee and a straight settee in the main cabin and an aft cabin with a double berth on the starboard side. The three cabin version adds a second aft cabin on the port side. The galley is located on the starboard side, just forward of the companionway ladder. The galley is "L"-shaped and is equipped with a two-burner stove, an ice box and a double sink. A navigation station is opposite the galley, on the port side. The head is located aft, on the port side and includes a shower. The three cabin version has a smaller head.

The design has a hull speed of

Operational history
In a 2016 review for boats.com, Rupert Holmes wrote, "it's worth noting that the hull length is 10.98m (36ft 0in), so in common with designs from a number of other manufacturers, this boat is not as large as the model name might imply. Having said that, the generous beam, combined with accommodation pushed as much as possible into the ends of the boat, means there’s still a lot of space by 36ft standards. The saloon is of a generous size, as is the well appointed galley, which has ample worktop and stowage space, and there's a small aft-facing navigation station on the port side of the saloon."

See also
List of sailing boat types

References

External links

Keelboats
2010s sailboat type designs
Sailing yachts
Sailboat type designs by Marc Lombard Design
Sailboat types built by Jeanneau